The following is a summary of the participation of Bhutan at the 2010 Summer Youth Olympics, held in Singapore between 14–26 August 2010.

Chimi Wangmo in Taekwondo was the only athlete to represent Bhutan. She was also the flag bearer in the Opening ceremony. She lost in the quarterfinal round of the Women's 49 kg Taekwondo event against American Jessie Bates, who later won Bronze in the event.

Taekwondo

References

External links
Competitors List: Bhutan

2010 in Bhutanese sport
Nations at the 2010 Summer Youth Olympics
Bhutan at the Youth Olympics